Vasundhara Enclave is a posh and expensive residential area located in East Delhi, at Delhi-Noida border, one of the 11 zones of Delhi. The adjoining areas include Dallupura Village, Mayur Vihar Phase III, New Kondli, New Ashok Nagar, Noida Sector - 6 & 7. Vasundhara Enclave has about forty-four apartments (group housing societies), six markets, nine-ten schools, two colleges, one hospital & one dispensary.

Facilities

Markets
 DDA Market (near city appts.)
 DDA Market (near Dainik Janyug appts)
 Vardhman Plaza
 Sunrise Plaza
 Plaza market (near Evergreen Public School)
 Sarpanch Market (near Cosmos Public School)

Apartments

 Abhimanyu Apartments
 Abhinav Apartments
 Abhyant Apartments
 Abul Fazal Apartments 
 Anekant Apartments
 Anupam Apartments
 Capital Apartments
 CEL Apartments
 City Apartments
 Deluxe Apartments
 Dainik Janyug Apartments
 Doctors Apartments
 Fancy Apartments
 Gobind Apartments
 Habitat Apartments
 Highland Apartments
 Hindon Apartments
 Ila Apartments
 Lahore Apartments
 Leiah Apartments
 Mahesh Apartments
 Manavsthali Apartment
 Mangal Apartment
 Mansara Apartment
 MOD Apartments
 Nav Jagriti Apartments
 Naval Apartments
 New Delhi Apartment
 New Pragatisheel Apartments
 Overseas Apartment
 Paryatan Vihar (B-8) Apartments
 Paryatan Vihar (B-4) Apartments
 Parvatiya Vihar Apartments
 Pawittra Apartment
 Prayag Apartments
 Puneet Apartments
 Samrat Apartments
 Satyam Aprtments
 Shantidoot Apartments
 Soochna Apartments
 Sreeniketan Apartments
 Triveni Apartments
 Police Computer Apartments (previously known as Vasundhara Apartments).
 Vishal Apartments
 Vishwakarma Apartment
Vidhata apartments

Schools
 Evergreen Public School
 Somerville School
 East Point Public School
 Cosmos Public School 
 Manav Bharti Public School
 Angels Public School
 Dashmesh Public School
 Govt. Sr. Sec. School
 Govt. Primary School

College
 Maharaja Agrasen College, University of Delhi
 Shaheed Rajguru College of Applied Sciences for Women, University of Delhi

Hospital
 Dharamshila Narayana Superspeciality Hospital
 Delhi Govt. Dispensary

Transport
 New Ashok Nagar metro station: Available facility Auto rickshaw and peddle rickshaw
 Mayur Vihar Extension: Available facility Auto rickshaw and peddle rickshaw
 Noida Sec-15 also called Gole Chakkar: Available facility Auto rickshaw and peddle rickshaw
 Connected till Shastri Park Metro Station by feeder buses
 The routes of few DTC buses like 118 (Mayur Vihar Phase 3 to ISBT) and 378 (Mayur Vihar Phase 3 to Central Secretariat) have been altered to connect Vasundhara Enclave with the buses.
 Feeder Bus route F-313 A starts from Maharaja Agarsen College and goes to Yamuna Vihar.

Sports Centre
 DDA Chilla Sports Complex which houses various sports facilities, gym, swimming pool, sports coaching facilities.

East Delhi district
Neighbourhoods in Delhi